The 2022–2026 Toronto City Council term is the present term of Toronto City Council. It consists of members elected in the 2022 municipal election and 2022 mayoral election held on October 24. The council term began on November 15, 2022.

Following the election, voters returned city councillors in the city's 25 wards as well as the mayor of Toronto, who is elected city-wide. The city uses a first-past-the-post system to elect all positions. Municipal elections in Ontario are held every four years on the fourth Monday in October. The next election will be October 26, 2026.

Changes to machinery of government 
Prior to the election, the province of Ontario passed the Strong Mayors Act, which granted the office of mayor additional powers including the development of the budget, creating council committees, appointing the chairs and vice chairs of those committees, the power to reorganize departments, appointing department heads, and appointing the city manager. The mayor was also granted the power to veto council decisions which do not align with priorities set by the province. On November 16, 2022, the province proposed further changes the powers of the mayor, introducing a bill which would allow by-laws to be passed with only one-third of council voting in favour if the mayor declared it to be in line with provincial priorities.

Timeline

2022 

 November 16, 2022: Mayor John Tory announces the appointment of Councillor Jennifer McKelvie (Scarborough Rouge Park) as deputy mayor.
 November 23, 2022: the ceremonial first session of council was held where councillors were presented with their declarations of office and the mayor's chain of office. The speaker and deputy speaker were elected, and the striking committee was formed to make recommendations to council on committee assignments.
 February 10, 2023: John Tory announces his intention to resign as mayor of Toronto.
February 17, 2023: Tory officially resigns as mayor.

Major mayoral decisions

2022 

 November 23, 2022 (1-2022): establish council committees and community councils.
 November 24, 2022 (2-2022): appoint the chairs and vice chairs of committees.
 December 2, 2022 (8-2022): appointment of Paul Johnson as city manager and chief administrative officer.
 February 17, 2023 (6-2023): delegated the power to appoint the city manager and deputies to council, and the power to hire senior division management to the city manager.

Major council decisions

2022 

 November 24, 2022: council votes unanimously to oppose the provincial government's new development bill, seeking to preserve the city’s rental replacement policy, parkland provisions and community and development charges.

Composition

Standing committees

Special committees

Community councils

References 

Municipal government of Toronto
2022 establishments in Ontario
2020s in Toronto